Billy Williams (2 May 1888 — 4 July 1946) was an  Australian rules footballer who played with St Kilda in the Victorian Football League (VFL).

Family
The only son of Henry Roberts Williams, MLA (1848-1935), and his first wife, Kate Williams (1854-1891), née Gruby, William Gruby Williams was born at Eaglehawk, Victoria on 2 May 1888.

Death
He died in Queensland on 4 July 1946.

Notes

References

External links 
 
 

Year of death missing
1888 births
Australian rules footballers from Victoria (Australia)
St Kilda Football Club players
Eaglehawk Football Club players
Mines Rovers Football Club players